The 2010 FIA WTCC Race of Belgium (formally the 2010 FIA WTCC Monroe Race of Belgium) was the fourth round of the 2010 World Touring Car Championship season and the second running of the FIA WTCC Race of Belgium. It was held at Circuit Zolder, near Heusden-Zolder, Belgium on 20 June 2010. It saw the return of the Race of Belgium to the championship, after it was last held at the Circuit de Spa-Francorchamps in 2005. The first race was won by Gabriele Tarquini for SR-Sport and the second race was won by Andy Priaulx for BMW Team RBM.

Background
After round three, Yvan Muller was leading the championship on 100 points, 24 ahead of Tarquini and Chevrolet RML teammate Robert Huff. Sergio Hernández was leading the Yokohama Independents' Trophy.

Two Belgian drivers joined the field for the event, with Vincent Radermecker joining the factory Chevrolet RML team, while Pierre-Yves Corthals returned to the WTCC in an Exagon Engineering run SEAT León 2.0 TFSI.

Report

Testing and free practice
Augusto Farfus set the fastest time in Friday testing, with his team–mate Priaulx finishing third. Between them was the Chevrolet Cruze of championship leader Muller. Darryl O'Young in the bamboo-engineering Chevrolet Lacetti was fourth fastest and the lead independent driver. Alain Menu and Huff saw reduced running thanks to technical problems. Radermecker was the fastest of the two Belgian drivers in tenth. Corthals was 21st in the sole petrol SEAT entry.

Tiago Monteiro was quickest in the drying conditions of free practice one on Saturday morning, with team–mates Tom Coronel and Jordi Gené second and third. Farfus was the top BMW in fourth and seventh placed Menu was the leading Chevrolet.

Gené led the final practice session with Monteiro second, Muller third and Menu in fourth. Harry Vaulkhard was the fastest independent driver in fifth. The session was brought to a close four minutes early when the engine in Tarquini's SEAT blew, bringing out the red flags.

Qualifying
Alain Menu was fastest in Q1 for Chevrolet, ahead of SR-Sport's Tiago Monteiro and Gabriele Tarquini.
The most notable casualty from the session was Tom Coronel, who was 11th fastest.

In the ten-minute Q2 session, eight of the ten competing cars set their first flying laptimes before rain began to fall over the circuit. Tarquini was fastest ahead of teammate Jordi Gené, Chevrolet teammates Menu and Yvan Muller and the SEATs of Norbert Michelisz, Fredy Barth and Monteiro. The BMW Team RBM pairing of Andy Priaulx and Augusto Farfus did not set times until after the rain arrived, meaning they could only set the ninth and tenth fastest times.

Warm-Up
BMW Team RBM pair Priaulx and Farfus led Sunday morning warm–up.

Race One
At the start of the race, pole sitter Tarquini was passed by SR-Sport teammate Gené. However, the Spaniard's start was put under investigation, as tt appeared that Gené was ahead of Tarquini as the pair crossed the line for the rolling start. Further behind, contact behind O'Young and Michel Nykjær put O'Young in the gravel, but he managed to rejoin the back of the pack. As the leaders remained in order, Kristian Poulsen passed Corthals for the independents lead and 12th place overall. Having dropped back to tenth place early on, Priaulx passed Coronel for eighth place and pole position for the reverse grid second race. Gené meanwhile took the victory ahead of Tarquini, Muller, Menu and Monteiro.

After the second race of the day, Gené was disqualified for a technical infringement, handing the victory to Tarquini.

Race Two
Polesitter Priaulx made a good start to Race Two. Fellow front-row starter Norbert Michelisz made a slow getaway, dropping him to eighth. Coronel also made a slow start from ninth place. Priaulx, Huff, Monteiro, Menu and Muller followed each other around until the end of the race. Farfus attempted to pass Tarquini for sixth around the outside of turn one, but ran wide and dropped back to eighth behind Michelisz. Hernández took the independents victory in ninth position ahead of Coronel.

Results

Qualifying

Race 1

Bold denotes Fastest lap.

Race 2

Bold denotes Fastest lap.

Standings after the event

Drivers' Championship standings

Yokohama Independents' Trophy standings

Manufacturers' Championship standings

 Note: Only the top five positions are included for both sets of drivers' standings.

References

Results Booklet PDF at MST Systems

External links
World Touring Car Championship official website

Belgium
FIA WTCC Race of Belgium
Circuit Zolder
FIA WTCC Race of Belgium